Central Moscow Hippodrome, founded in 1834 in Moscow, is the largest horse racing track in Russia. The site includes a horse breeding research facility.

References

External links

  

Horse racing venues in Russia
Sports venues in Moscow
1834 establishments in the Russian Empire
Cultural heritage monuments of regional significance in Moscow